South Carolina Highway 394 (SC 394) is a  state highway in the U.S. state of South Carolina. The highway connects rural areas of Aiken and Orangeburg counties with North, via Salley.

Route description
SC 394 begins at an intersection with SC 4 (Surrey Race Road) north-northeast of Windsor, within Aiken County. This intersection is north-northeast of Aiken State Park. It travels to the east and intersects the southern terminus of SC 113 (Dixie Road). It crosses over Dean Swamp Creek before it enters the city limits of Salley. In the town, the highway has an intersection with SC 39 (Railroad Avenue). After it leaves Salley, it enters Orangeburg County just before it crosses over Goodland Creek. The highway curves to the northeast and intersects SC 389 (Ninety-Six Road). It then begins heading to the east again before an intersection with SC 3 (Capital Way/Whetstone Road). The highway curves to the northeast and crosses the North Fork Edisto River and Penn Branch before it meets its eastern terminus, an intersection with U.S. Route 178 (US 178; North Road), just west of North. Here, the roadway continues as Salley Road.

Major intersections

See also

References

External links

SC 394 South Carolina Hwy Index

394
Transportation in Aiken County, South Carolina
Transportation in Orangeburg County, South Carolina